Ayimkhan Turymbetovna Shamuratova (Ayimxan) (1917–1993) was a Karakalpak — theater actress, singer (mezzo-soprano), and public figure. She was the only Karakalpak woman to be awarded the title People's Artist of the USSR (1968).

Early life 
Ayimkhan was born on 10 June (or 5 June or 10 October) 1917 in Kanlykul (now the center of Kanlykul district Karakalpakstana) (or Kungrad) in Dekhanina to a poor family.

Career 
Starting in 1932, she performed in the troupe of Kungrad and later in Turtkul theater, where she debuted in one-act plays for the progenitors of Karakalpak theater, A. Utepov and S. Mazhitov.

From 1934 to 1939, 1949 to 1951, and 1955 to 1988 she was an actress at Karakalpak Theater of Musical Drama and Comedy. К. С. Stanislavsky (now named after Berdakh) in Nukus. She played more than 100 leading roles in plays of Karakalpak, Uzbek, Kazakh, Russian, Azerbaijani, Kyrgyz and other dramatists.

In 1939 she enrolled at Moscow Conservatory.

From 1939 to 1949 and 1951 to 1955 she was a soloist of the Karakalpak Philharmonic. Berdakh and radio.

She also performed as a concert singer. Her repertoire included folk, ritual, folklore, lyrical and modern songs, musical arrangements of folk tunes "Bozatau", "Aryuhan", "Sorghol", "Aksungul" by her mentors Bakhsa E. Kospulatov, composers A. Halimov, J. Shamuratov, A. Sultanovat and many others.

She participated in concert groups at the fronts of World War II.

Her memoir is My Life Is Theater.

She became a member of the CPSU in 1957. She served as Deputy of the Supreme Soviet of Karakalpak ASSR of the 4th and 7th convocations.

She died 29 May 1993 (31 May) in Nukusa.

The classic Karakalpak poet Ibrahim Yusupov dedicated the poem "The Fate of an Actress" to her.

Personal life 
Ayimkhan married Amet, and they had seven children. She was widowed soon.

Recognition 
 People's Artist of the Karakalpak ASSR (1940)
 People's Artist of the Uzbek SSR (1950)
 People's Artist of the USSR (1968)
 Two orders of the Red Banner of Labor (including 1959)
 Order of the Badge of Honor (1951)
 Medals
 Certificates of Merit of the Supreme Soviets of Uzbekistan and Karakalpakstan.

References

People from Nukus
Russian stage actresses